William Pole-Tylney-Long-Wellesley may refer to:

William Pole-Tylney-Long-Wellesley, 4th Earl of Mornington
William Pole-Tylney-Long-Wellesley, 5th Earl of Mornington

See also
William Pole (disambiguation)